Henry Sherard Osborn Ashington (25 September 1891 – 31 January 1917) was an English track and field athlete from Southport, who competed in the 1912 Summer Olympics.

Ashington was born in 1891 in Southport, Lancashire the son of Sherard and Lydia Ashington, his father was a solicitor.

In 1912 he finished tenth in the long jump competition and 15th in the standing long jump event.

Ashington was killed in action, aged 25, during the First World War, serving as a captain with the East Yorkshire Regiment near Combles. He was buried in the Combles Communal Cemetery nearby.

See also
 List of Olympians killed in World War I

References

1891 births
1917 deaths
Sportspeople from Southport
English male long jumpers
Olympic athletes of Great Britain
Athletes (track and field) at the 1912 Summer Olympics
East Yorkshire Regiment officers
British military personnel killed in World War I
British Army personnel of World War I